The San Marino women's national softball team is the national team of the San Marino. It is governed by the Federazione Sammarinese Baseball-Softball.

Results
 World Championship

 nc = not competed

 European Championship

 nc = not competed

 ESF Junior Girls Championship

 nc = not competed

References

External links 
 International Softball Federation

Softball
Women's national softball teams
Softball in San Marino
Women's sport in San Marino